The Lawson Memorial Hospital is a health facility in Ben Bhraggie Terrace, Golspie, Scotland. It is managed by NHS Highland.

History  
The facility, which was designed by John Hinton Gall, was built as a memorial to Alexander Brown Lawson and opened in 1899. An extra wing, known as the Cambusavie Wing, was added in 1935 and, after the hospital had joined the National Health Service in 1948, further extensions were completed in the 1970s and in 1989. John Lennon, the musician, was treated in the hospital after a road traffic accident in 1969.

References 

NHS Highland
Hospitals in Highland (council area)
NHS Scotland hospitals
Hospital buildings completed in 1899
Hospitals established in 1899
1899 establishments in Scotland
Golspie